Márcio Ferreira Nobre (born November 6, 1980), also known as Mert Nobre, is a Brazilian professional football manager and former footballer who currently is the manager of Çorum FK.

Nobre spent about 15 years in Turkey as a football player. He acquired Turkish citizenship in 2006. Nobre also got his first managerial job in Turkey, when he was named the manager of Gençlerbirliği in August 2020.

Career statistics

Club

Managerial record

References

External links
 
 
 
 CBF 

1980 births
Living people
Sportspeople from Mato Grosso do Sul
Association football forwards
Brazilian footballers
Brazilian football managers
Turkish footballers
Turkish football managers
Brazilian emigrants to Turkey
Naturalized citizens of Turkey
Turkish people of Brazilian descent
Cruzeiro Esporte Clube players
Beşiktaş J.K. footballers
Büyükşehir Belediye Erzurumspor footballers
Fenerbahçe S.K. footballers
Gençlerbirliği S.K. footballers
Kashiwa Reysol players
Kayserispor footballers
Mersin İdman Yurdu footballers
Paraná Clube players
FC Wil players
Campeonato Brasileiro Série A players
J1 League players
Süper Lig players
Swiss Challenge League players
Brazilian expatriate footballers
Brazilian expatriate sportspeople in Turkey
Brazilian expatriate sportspeople in Japan
Expatriate footballers in Turkey
Expatriate footballers in Japan
Expatriate footballers in Switzerland
Gençlerbirliği S.K. managers
Altay S.K. managers
Converts to Islam